Miss Japan is a national beauty pageant in Japan. The pageant first ran from 1952-1995 and was led by Yoshinaga (Japanese-American Press). In 2019, the Miss Japan pageant returned with Akihiro Yoshida, Takako Hashimura, Ichiro Tahara and Takahide Kitai, from the HDR Corporation, all as Senior directors. The HDR Corporation started the new Miss Japan competition after they lost the franchises for both Miss Universe and Miss Earth.

The current Miss Japan is Senna Ogawa of Iwate Prefecture. She was crowned Miss Japan 2020 on September 29, 2020.

The HDR Corporation also operates the Mister Japan contest.

Titleholders

Winners by prefectures

See also
Miss Grand Japan
Miss Earth Japan
Miss International Japan
Miss Universe Japan
Miss World Japan
Miss Nippon

References

External links

 
Beauty pageants in Japan
Japanese awards